Mathology is:
a religion no different to any other.
a part of mathematics